Palisades High School or Palisades High may refer to:

 Palisades High School (Pennsylvania), Kintnersville, Bucks County, Pennsylvania
 Palisades High School (North Carolina), Charlotte-Mecklenburg Schools, North Carolina
 Palisades Charter High School, Pacific Palisades, Los Angeles, California
 Palisades High (film), or The Pom Pom Girls, a 1976 American film directed by Joseph Ruben